

Carl Rodenburg (17 May 1894 – 5 November 1992) was a general in the Wehrmacht of Nazi Germany who commanded the 76th Infantry Division during the Battle of Stalingrad. He was a recipient of the  Knight's Cross of the Iron Cross with Oak Leaves. Rodenburg surrendered to the Soviet forces on 31 January 1943, during the Battle of Stalingrad. He was held until 1955.

Awards and decorations
 Iron Cross (1914) 2nd Class (25 April 1915) & 1st Class  (15 May 1917)

 Clasp to the Iron Cross (1939) 2nd Class (17 May 1940) & 1st Class  (25 May 1940)
 German Cross in Gold on 7 March 1942 as Oberst in Infanterie-Regiment 203
 Knight's Cross of the Iron Cross with Oak Leaves
 Knight's Cross on 8 October 1942 as Generalmajor and commander of the 76. Infantry-Division
 189th Oak Leaves on 31 January 1943 as Generalmajor and commander of the 76. Infantry-Division

References

Citations

Bibliography

 
 
 

1894 births
1992 deaths
People from Bremerhaven
Lieutenant generals of the German Army (Wehrmacht)
German Army personnel of World War I
Recipients of the clasp to the Iron Cross, 1st class
Recipients of the Gold German Cross
Recipients of the Knight's Cross of the Iron Cross with Oak Leaves
German prisoners of war in World War II held by the Soviet Union
German commanders at the Battle of Stalingrad
Military personnel from Bremen
German Army generals of World War II